Pseudonocardia hierapolitana is a bacterium from the genus of Pseudonocardia which has been isolated from soil.

References

Pseudonocardia
Bacteria described in 2014